"Made of Stars" is a song performed by Israeli singer Hovi Star. The song represented Israel in the Eurovision Song Contest 2016, and was written and produced by Doron Medalie. The song was released as a digital download on 30 March 2016 through Universal Music Group.

Eurovision Song Contest

The Israeli entry for the Eurovision Song Contest 2016 was selected through the reality singing competition HaKokhav HaBa L'Eirovizion ("The Next Star for Eurovision"). The competition consisted of fifteen shows, which commenced on 5 December 2015 and concluded on 3 March 2016. The final took place on 3 March 2016 at the G.G. Studios in Neve Ilan, Jerusalem. The four performers were matched with a potential Eurovision Song Contest song chosen from over 100 submissions by a professional committee with members from IBA, Keshet and the Israeli Broadcasting Corporation. The winner was selected in two rounds. In the first round the four performers competed in duels and each performed a cover song. The two duel winners advanced to the second round based on a public vote as well as votes from each member of the judging panel who had the option of boosting the performer's score by 3%. Hovi performed "Stay with Me" during the first round he advanced to the second round where he performed his Eurovision song, he won with 68% of the public vote.

Music video
A music video to accompany the release of "Made of Stars" was first released onto Star's YouTube channel on 13 March 2016 at a total length of three minutes and fourteen seconds.

Track listing

Chart performance

Weekly charts

Release history

See also
Eurovision
Eurovision Song Contest 2016
Israel
Israel in the Eurovision Song Contest 2016

References

Eurovision songs of Israel
Eurovision songs of 2016
2016 songs
2016 singles
Universal Music Group singles
Songs written by Doron Medalie
English-language Israeli songs